Akwukwu-Igbo is the headquarters of Oshimili North Local Government Area of Delta State, Nigeria. It is located in the Delta North senatorial zone of the state. The occupation of the locals are mainly farming and fishing and It is made up of several quarters which includes Ogbe-Ani, Ogbe-Onihe, Umu-Onai, Ogbe-Obi, Ogbe-Iyase, Umuekeke, Achala, Umu-Olum, Umu-Opu etc. This land is sometimes called  the "Land of Desert Warriors".

The one time Attorney General of the Federal Republic of Nigeria (Late Chief Michael Ashikodi Agbamuche) and May Agbamuche-Mbu (INEC National Commissioner- Chair of Legal Services and Supervisor Bayelsa, Edo and Rivers State) also hails from Akwukwu-Igbo. Its has neighbouring communities in the same local government area such as Illah, Ebu, Okpanam, Onitcha-Olona etc. The current traditional ruler of Akwukwu-igbo is Obi David Azuka I who hails from Ogbe-Obi quarters. This town also has primary and secondary schools amongst which two very old schools are Agbogidi Primary School and Akwukwu-Igbo Grammar School.

Notable people from Akwukwu-Igbo 
 Newton Jibunoh
 Obi David Azuka I
 Enyi Doris Mokobia

References 

Populated places in Delta State